Liberty Township is one of twelve townships in Hendricks County, Indiana, United States. As of the 2010 census, its population was 5,772.

Geography
The stream of Cosner Branch runs through this township.

Cities and towns
 Clayton
 Plainfield (west edge)

Unincorporated towns
 Belleville
 Cartersburg
 Center Valley
 Hazelwood
 Magnetic Springs
 North Belleville
 Summit
 Hello, Indiana
(This list is based on USGS data and may include former settlements.)

Adjacent townships
 Center Township (north)
 Washington Township (northeast)
 Guilford Township (east)
 Monroe Township, Morgan County (south)
 Adams Township, Morgan County (southwest)
 Clay Township (west)
 Franklin Township (west)

Cemeteries
The township contains twelve cemeteries: Buchanan, Center Valley Friendship Baptist, Clayton, Davis, Friendship Missionary Baptist, Irons, Jones, McCormack, Miles, Salem Methodist, Spring Hill and Ungles.

Major highways
  Interstate 70
  U.S. Route 40
  State Road 39

Airports and landing strips
 Cooper Airport 05IN

Education
Liberty Township residents may obtain a free library card from the Clayton-Liberty Township Public Library in Clayton.

References
 
 United States Census Bureau cartographic boundary files

External links

Townships in Hendricks County, Indiana
Townships in Indiana